Marauders is a 1986 Australian film about two youths roaming the countryside and committing violence. It was privately funded, and was Mark Savage's first feature.

References

External links
Review at Soiled Sinema
Review at Joblo
Review at Dead Central
Enver Yurtsever

Australian crime drama films
1980s English-language films
1986 films
1986 crime drama films
1980s Australian films